91st Regiment or 91st Infantry Regiment may refer to:

 91st Regiment of Foot (disambiguation), several units of the British Army
 91st Punjabis (Light Infantry), a unit of the British Indian Army
 91st Cavalry Regiment, United States
 91st Coast Artillery (United States)

Union Army (American Civil War):
 91st Illinois Volunteer Infantry Regiment
 91st Indiana Infantry Regiment
 91st New York Volunteer Infantry Regiment
 91st Ohio Infantry
 91st Pennsylvania Infantry

See also 
 91st Division (disambiguation)